Goalball at the 2010 Asian Para Games were held in Guangyao Gymnasium from 13 to 18 December. There were 2 gold medals in this sport.

Medalists

Men's tournament

Group Round

Group A

Group B

Tournament bracket

Women's tournament

References

Goalball results

2010 Asian Para Games events